Formula E, abbreviated to FE, is the highest class of auto racing for electric cars defined by the Fédération Internationale de l'Automobile (FIA), motorsport's world governing body. Each year, the FE World Championship season is held. It consists of a series of races, known as ePrix, held usually held on temporary street circuits within city centers. Drivers are awarded points based on their finishing position in each race, and the driver who accumulates the most points over each championship is crowned that year's Formula E World Drivers' Champion. As of the 2023 Cape Town ePrix, there have been 79 Formula E drivers from 21 different nationalities who have raced at least one of the 105 Formula E races since the first such event, the 2014 Beijing ePrix.

Two-time champion Jean-Éric Vergne hold the record for the most championships. Lucas di Grassi & Sebastien Buemi both hold the record for the most wins with 13, Buemi & Vergne also hold the record for most pole positions with 15, di Grassi has the most points with 1,027, and the most podiums with 40, he has entered more ePrix than anyone else (105) and also holds the record for the most ePrix starts (104). The United Kingdom is the most represented country, having produced 115 drivers. Six countries have been represented by just one. South Africa became the latest country to be represented by a driver when Kelvin van der Linde made his Formula E debut at the 2023 Diriyah ePrix driving for the ABT CUPRA Formula E Team. The most recent driver to make their Formula One debut is van der Linde.

Drivers

By nationality

References

 
Formula E drivers